The University of Rochester Medical Center (URMC), now known as UR Medicine, is located in Rochester, New York, is one of the main campuses of the University of Rochester and comprises the university's primary medical education, research and patient care facilities.

Schools and facilities
URMC is one of the largest facilities for medical treatment and research in Upstate New York and includes a regional Prenatal Center, Trauma Center, Burn Center, Cancer Center, an Epilepsy Center, Psychiatric/Behavioral Health Emergency and treatment departments, Liver Transplant Center and Cardiac Transplant Center and also includes a major AIDS Treatment Center and an NIH-designated AIDS Vaccine Evaluation Unit. A large portion of the university's biomedical research is conducted in the Arthur Kornberg Medical Research Building and the Aab Institute of Biomedical Sciences.

In January 2008, the University of Rochester announced a $500 million strategic plan geared toward expansion in research and patient services. The plan anticipated adding 1,800 new jobs to the university, building a 123-bed addition to the hospital, a building for clinical and translational sciences, and a new ambulatory surgery center.

Strong Memorial Hospital

Strong Memorial Hospital is the main teaching hospital and patient care facility at the University of Rochester and is housed within the main complex of the URMC. It is a Level I trauma center serving the Rochester area.

Golisano Children's Hospital 

Golisano Children's Hospital (GCH) formerly Children's Hospital at Strong, is a nationally ranked, freestanding acute care children's hospital in Rochester, New York. It is affiliated with the University of Rochester School of Medicine and Dentistry. The hospital has 190 pediatric beds. The hospital provides comprehensive pediatric specialties and subspecialties to infants, children, teens, and young adults aged 0–21. The hospital also treats adults that require pediatric care. The hospital shares the rooftop helipad for the attached Strong Memorial Hospital and is an ACS verified level I pediatric trauma center, one of the only ones in the region. The hospital features a regional pediatric intensive-care unit and an American Academy of Pediatrics verified level IV neonatal intensive care unit.

School of Medicine and Dentistry
The School of Medicine and Dentistry (SMD) is an accredited medical school and school for advanced dental education, with graduate education programs in biomedical, biological and health sciences. The facilities of the school are located in the URMC complex and the adjoining Arthur Kornberg Medical Research Building with research facilities. Dental education and patient facilities are located within the URMC complex and the Eastman Institute for Oral Health.

SMD has ranked in the top 35 graduate schools by U.S. News & World Report several times. SMD also received a full six-year accreditation by the Accreditation Council for Graduate Medical Education for its 26 residency programs at Strong Memorial Hospital in 2005. The medical school opened in 1925, and its first class graduated in 1929.

School of Nursing
The School of Nursing is an accredited nursing education program located in the Helen Wood Hall building of URMC. In 2018, the school's Pediatric Nurse Practitioner program was ranked the 12th best in the U.S., with the School of Nursing landing 37th for the nursing master’s program and the Family Nurse Practitioner program ranked 17th by U.S. News.

Recent developments
Several programs and centers have been founded at URMC. In 2006, a cancer stem cell research program was established at the Wilmot Cancer Center, one of only three such programs in the United States, the others being at Harvard University and Stanford University. In 2006, a new Clinical and Translational Sciences Institute was announced. The program was awarded a $40 million NIH grant.

In 2013, URMC acquired Lakeside Hospital in Brockport and renamed it URMC Strong West. When it reopened, it had an urgent care center and planned to add an emergency department. Since 2016, URMC has created a network of Urgent Care centers branded as UR Medicine Urgent Care in the Rochester, NY area.

Funding and budget
URMC comprises the largest portion of the University of Rochester's annual budget. For the 2004-2005 fiscal year, URMC's patient care and hospital resources accounted for 59% of the total university budget at $910 million. URMC also makes up a large portion of the university's $232 million research budget.

Famous Faculty
George Packer Berry (Prof. 1932-1949), later dean of Harvard Medical School
Henrik Dam (Prof. 1942-1945), Nobel laureate (1943, physiology or medicine)
George L. Engel, psychiatrist and creator of biopsychosocial model
Paul Fiset, microbiologist and developer of the Q fever vaccine
Kenneth Ouriel, vascular surgeon and researcher
George Hoyt Whipple (Prof. 1914-1976), Nobel laureate (1934, physiology or medicine)

Alumni
 Jason Diamond, plastic surgeon
 Mary Calderone, physician and public health advocate who was an instrumental figure in the advancement of reproductive rights and sex education in the United States.
 Arthur Kornberg, molecular biologist who won the Nobel Prize in Physiology or Medicine 1959 for his discovery of "the mechanisms in the biological synthesis of deoxyribonucleic acid (DNA)." Severo Ochoa of New York University was a co-recipient of the award.
 Richard Locksley, medical doctor, professor and researcher of infectious diseases at the University of California, San Francisco
 William Masters, sexologist
 Philip A. Pizzo, David and Susan Heckerman Professor and Professor of Microbiology and Immunology and former Dean of the Stanford University School of Medicine
 Renée Richards, former professional tennis player
 Eric Topol, Scripps Health Chief Academic Officer, cardiologist
 Warren Zapol, director of the Massachusetts General Hospital Anesthesia Center for Critical Care Research

See also
Eastman Institute for Oral Health

References

External links
URMC Homepage
School of Medicine and Dentistry
School of Nursing
Eastman Institute for Oral Health
UR Medicine Urgent Care

Medical Center
Rochester, University of, Medical Center
Nursing schools in New York (state)
Hospitals in Rochester, New York